At least three ships of the Argentine Navy have been named Santísima Trinidad, with or without the prefix ARA  (  Armada República Argentina):
 , a brigantine that participated in the Argentine War of Independence in 1814–16. She was commanded by Miguel Brown, and then by his brother Admiral William Brown.
 , ex-, a patrol frigate of the U.S.  which served in the Argentine Navy from 1948 to 1969. She was renamed Comodoro Augusto Lasserre (Q-9), when she became a survey ship in 1963.
 , a Type 42 destroyer in service 1981 to 1989, which participated in the Falklands War in 1982.

See also 
 Santísima Trinidad (disambiguation)

Argentine Navy ship names